Žan Jakše is a Slovenian slalom canoeist who has competed at the international level since 2015.

He won a bronze medal in the K1 team event at the 2017 ICF Canoe Slalom World Championships in Pau.

World Cup individual podiums

References

Living people
Slovenian male canoeists
Year of birth missing (living people)
Medalists at the ICF Canoe Slalom World Championships